Scénes de ballet was performed with students from the School of American Ballet and choreographed by Christopher Wheeldon to Stravinsky's eponymous music from 1944. It was Wheeldon's second work for the New York City Ballet. The premiere took place on Wednesday, May 19, 1999, at the New York State Theater with a set designed by Ian Falconer and costumes designed by Holly Hynes. For the ballet, Falconer created a Russian ballet studio, bisected by a "real" barre and an imaginary mirror. Sixty-two ballet students ranging from the very young to those in their last year of study were cast, some as "real" dancers and others as their "reflection" in the "mirror".

Original cast
 young dancers
 Isabel Vondermuhll
 Jan Burkhard
 Zakary Yermolenko
 Ryan Cardea

Reviews 
 
 NY Times, Anna Kisselgoff, May 21, 1999
 NY Times, Jennifer Dunning, May 30, 2006

 NY Times, John Rockwell, June 7, 2006
 NY Times, Roslyn Sulcas, June 10, 2010

Articles 
 NY Times, Jennifer Dunning, February 19, 2006

Ballets by Christopher Wheeldon
New York City Ballet repertory
Ballets by Igor Stravinsky
1999 ballet premieres
Ballets designed by Ian Falconer
Ballets designed by Holly Hynes